Charia is a census village in Nalbari district, Assam, India. As per the 2011 Census of India, Charia has a total population of 2,477 people including 1,289 males and 1,188 females with a literacy rate of 64.19%.

References 

Villages in Nalbari district